The Nazareth Subdistrict was one of the subdistricts of Mandatory Palestine. It was located around the city of Nazareth. After the 1948 Arab-Israeli War, the district disintegrated; having fallen entirely within Modern-day Israel, it was merged with the Beisan Subdistrict into the Jezreel Subdistrict.

Depopulated towns and villages

(current localities in parentheses)

al-Mujaydil (Migdal HaEmek, Yifat)
Indur 
Ma'alul (Kfar HaHoresh, Migdal HaEmek, Timrat)
Saffuriyya (HaSolelim, Heftziba, Sde Nahum, Tzippori)

Subdistricts of Mandatory Palestine